Euston Square is a London Underground station at the corner of Euston Road and Gower Street, just north of University College London – its main entrance faces the tower of University College Hospital. The multi-interchange Euston station is beyond Euston Square Gardens, which is one street east. The station is between Great Portland Street and King's Cross St Pancras on the Circle, Hammersmith & City and Metropolitan lines in Travelcard Zone 1.

History

The station was opened as "Gower Street" on 10 January 1863 by the Metropolitan Railway (MR), the world's first underground railway. The line runs east–west under Euston Road at this point. The station originally had entrances in single-storey pavilions with stone-effect stucco render on each side of Euston Road with stairs to the platforms.

The MR was constructed using the cut-and-cover method with the tunnel and station platforms directly under the road. Ventilation shafts lined with glazed white tiling were spaced along the platforms to let in light from openings in the front gardens of the houses at street level.

In 1864, Parliament authorised the North Western and Charing Cross Railway to construct a line to connect the mainline stations at Euston and Charing Cross. This would have connected to the MR to the west of Gower Street, but the company was unable to raise funds. A revised scheme under the name of the London Central Railway (LCR) was approved in 1871. The proposals included an interchange at Gower Street with the LCR's platforms north of and parallel to the MR's. LCR branches would have connected from east of Gower Street to Euston and St Pancras stations. As before, the LCR was unable to raise funding and the scheme was abandoned in 1874.

In 1890, the MR obtained parliamentary permission to construct a pedestrian subway under Euston Road from the station to the mainline station. This was never constructed.

In 1906, the original timber platforms were reconstructed in concrete as a fire precaution related to the electrification of the MR. The station was given its present name on 1 November 1909.

Between 1929 and 1931, the station buildings were reconstructed to a design by the MR's architect C. W. Clark. A bridge was constructed above the tracks so that a single ticket office could be provided in place of the separate ones for each platform. At the same time the station platforms were lengthened requiring the closure of Euston Road to enable the roadway and tunnels to be excavated as quickly as possible. The brick arch of the tunnel roof and the side walls were removed and replaced with a flat roof on steel beams supported by concrete walls to the rear of the new platforms.

During World War II, much of the southern side of Euston Road between Gower Street and Gordon Street was destroyed by bombing. When the site was reconstructed post-war the southern entrance was reconstructed again to incorporate it into the corner of the new building that occupied the site. The north entrance remained. In the 1960s, in conjunction with the construction of an underpass at the junction of Euston Road and Tottenham Court Road, Euston Road was widened. At this time, the north entrance building was demolished and converted to a simple subway entrance.

In the 21st century, the buildings on the south side of Euston Road were again redeveloped and the station entrance was again reconstructed. Since late 2006, the south entrance is incorporated into the corner of the headquarters of the Wellcome Trust with the entrance in Gower Street. A linking pedestrian subway connects under Euston Road from the north side. Since 2011, two lifts provide access between the main entrance and the westbound platform.

Future
In December 2005, Network Rail announced plans to create a subway link between the station and Euston station as part of the re-development of Euston station. This will create a direct link for users of main line rail services which depart from Euston. These plans would also be pursued during a rebuilding for High Speed 2.

Services 

All three lines share the same pair of tracks from Baker Street Junction to Aldgate Junction making this section of track one of the most intensely used on the London Underground network.

Circle line 

The typical service in trains per hour (tph) is:

 6  clockwise via Liverpool Street and Tower Hill
 6 tph anti-clockwise to Hammersmith via Paddington

Hammersmith & City line 
The typical service in trains per hour (tph) is:

 6 tph Eastbound to Barking
 6 tph Westbound to Hammersmith via Paddington

Metropolitan line 

The Metropolitan line is the only line to operate express services, though currently this is only during peak times (Westbound 06:30-09:30 / Eastbound 16:00-19:00). Fast services run non-stop between Wembley Park, Harrow-On-The-Hill and Moor Park, while semi-fast services run non-stop between Wembley Park and Harrow-On-The-Hill.

The typical off-peak service in trains per hour (tph) is:

 12 tph Eastbound to Aldgate
 2 tph Westbound to Amersham (all stations)
 2 tph Westbound to Chesham (all stations)
 8 tph Westbound to Uxbridge (all stations)

Off-peak services to/from Watford terminate at Baker Street

The typical peak time service in trains per hour (tph) is:
 14 tph Eastbound to Aldgate
 2 tph Westbound to Amersham (fast in the evening peak only)
 2 tph Westbound to Chesham (fast in the evening peak only)
 4 tph Westbound to Watford (semi-fast in the evening peak only)
 6 tph Westbound to Uxbridge (all stations)

Connections
London Buses routes 18, 24, 27, 29, 30, 73, 134, 205 and 390 and night routes N5, N18, N20, N29, N73, N205, N253 and N279 serve the station.

References

Bibliography

External links

Historic photographs of the station: London Transport Museum Photographs Collection

Station buildings, 1936

Circle line (London Underground) stations
Hammersmith & City line stations
Metropolitan line stations
Tube stations in the London Borough of Camden
Former Metropolitan Railway stations
Railway stations in Great Britain opened in 1863